Hedgerley is a village and civil parish in South Bucks district in Buckinghamshire, England. The parish has incorporated the formerly separate parish of Hedgerley Dean since 1934 (which was once a hamlet in parish of Farnham Royal).

The toponym name "Hedgerley" is derived from the Old English meaning "Hycga's woodland clearing".  In manorial rolls in 1195 it was recorded as Huggeleg.

Architecture and geography
Situated in the foothills of the Chiltern Hills, Hedgerley is a linear layout of red-brick and timber-framed cottages, amongst which Victoria Cottages date from the 16th century.  It is bounded to the north by the M40 motorway.

The old Quaker House on the northern edge of the village dates from 1487.

The Church of England parish church of Saint Mary the Virgin was designed by the Gothic Revival architect Benjamin Ferrey and built in 1852. The Tudor Revival Rectory was built in 1846.

In film, fiction and the media
The 1953 British film Genevieve was shot on roads around Pinewood Studios and the couples stop for a “hair of the dog” at the old (now demolished) One Pin pub with Genevive seen driving down Hedgerley Hill as well as actors John Gregson and Dinah Sheridan  filmed in Collinswood Road.

Scenes from Lionel Jeffries' 1972 family film The Amazing Mr Blunden were filmed in the village and at the church.

The village including the fields and woods of the parish featured in the episode "Secrets & Spies" of Midsomer Murders.

Demography

The village's most notable resident was the infamous Judge Jeffreys (1645–89).

A few fields in the parish are called the sea fields as in spring they become full with bluebells.

References

Sources

External links

Villages in Buckinghamshire
Civil parishes in Buckinghamshire